Irina "Iru" Khechanovi (born 3 December 2000), also known mononymously as Iru (stylised in all caps), is a Georgian singer and songwriter. As a member of the girl group Candy, she won the Junior Eurovision Song Contest 2011 with the song "Candy Music". In 2023, she won the fifth season of The Voice Georgia, therefore winning the right to represent Georgia in the Eurovision Song Contest 2023, to be held in Liverpool, United Kingdom.

Biography 
Khechanovi was born on 3 December 2000 in Tbilisi. She is of Armenian descent. As a child, she took part in various singing competitions. In 2011, on her eleventh birthday, she represented Georgia in the Junior Eurovision Song Contest 2011 in Yerevan, Armenia as a member of the girl group Candy. The group won the competition with 108 points.

In 2019, Khechanovi was a participant in Georgian Idol. In 2021, she released her debut solo single "No Jerk Around Me".

In 2022, Khechanovi performed at the Junior Eurovision Song Contest 2022 as part of a previous winners' medley. She had also co-written the song "I Believe" by Mariam Bigvava, the Georgian entry for that year's contest. The entry finished in third place.

Later that year, Khechanovi was a participant in the fifth season of The Voice Georgia. She went on to win the competition on 2 February 2023, thereby winning the right to represent Georgia in the Eurovision Song Contest 2023. Her entry "Echo" was released on 16 March 2023, and she is set to perform in the second semi-final on 11 May 2023.

Discography

Singles 
 2021 – "No Jerk Around Me"
 2022 – "Not Like Today"
 2022 – "Tu mama"
 2023 – "Idea"
 2023 – "Echo"

References

External links 
 

2000 births
Living people
21st-century women singers from Georgia (country)
Eurovision Song Contest entrants for Georgia (country)
Eurovision Song Contest entrants of 2023
Idols (franchise) participants
Musicians from Tbilisi
Pop singers from Georgia (country)
Georgian people of Armenian descent
The Voice (franchise) winners